Kampfite is a rare barium silicate–carbonate–halide mineral with the chemical formula . Discovered in 1964 and described in 2001, it is named after Anthony R. Kampf. The mineral is known only from Fresno County, California.

Description
Kampfite is translucent and light blue-gray in color.

Composition and structure
The structural  noted in the original description was not found in the later work.

The structure consists of double layers of tetrahedra connected by barium-containing polyhedra. It is this layering which causes kampfite's one perfect cleavage. Kampfite shares chemical and structural similarities with cymrite. , it is the only known barium silicate carbonate aside from fencooperite.

Occurrence
Kampfite has been found in association with celsian, fresnoite, macdonaldite, pyrrhotite, titantaramellite, traskite, and witherite. The mineral is known only from locations in Fresno County, California. Kampfite is found in quartz-rich regions of sanbornite rocks within gneiss which has undergone contact metamorphism associated with an adjacent granodiorite intrusive.

History
The mineral discovered in 1964 by Robert Walstrom from the Esquire #1 claim of the Rush Creek deposit in eastern Fresno County. It was described in 2001 in The Canadian Mineralogist. The mineral was named kampfite in honor of Anthony Robert Kampf (1948–), curator of the Los Angeles County Museum of Natural History, for his crystallography work on new and rare minerals.

Co-type specimens are held by the University of British Columbia and the Geological Survey of Canada.

References

Bibliography

External links
Photos of kampfite from mindat.org

Barium minerals
Carbonate minerals
Phyllosilicates
Monoclinic minerals
Minerals in space group 9